Italian Idol is an upcoming reality singing competition and Italian version of American television series created by Simon Fuller, to be aired on Canale 5.

Format

Judges and hosts

Season summary

Television ratings

References

Italian reality television series
Canale 5 original programming